Fort Assiniboine is a hamlet in northwest Alberta, Canada, within Woodlands County. It is located along the north shore of the Athabasca River at the junction of Highway 33 and Highway 661.

Fort Assiniboine was founded as a trading post by the Hudson's Bay Company and became a stopping point along the Klondike Trail. It gets its name from the Assiniboine people. The fort itself no longer exists, but the land on which it stood is designated as a National Historic Site for its archaeological value. The hamlet, built on and around the site of the fort, is a now a local hub for the surrounding agricultural region.

History 
Local oral history tells of an early (possibly late 1700s) North West Company fur trading post south of Holmes Crossing (an early ferry crossing) on the Athabasca River. In 1821, the North West Company was merged with Hudson's Bay Company (HBC), who then undertook to reorganize its transportation routes, seeking out advantages and efficiencies in its operations. By then, trade on Lesser Slave Lake was in decline and the council adopted a resolution in 1823 calling for a fort further up the Athabasca River to reduce transport times. Under the new plan, Fort Assiniboine on the Athabasca River (the fort was originally named 'Athabaska River House') became the northwest end of an overland  horse track to Edmonton House/Fort Edmonton, cut by Jacques Cardinal, a Métis free trader, in 1824–25. The trail became known as 'The Hudson's Bay Packtrail'. This provided a straighter route from Jasper House and the Athabasca Pass within the Rocky Mountains to York Factory on Hudson Bay. A party on horseback could make the trip from Edmonton to Fort Assiniboine in two to six days, depending on conditions. The new post opened in 1824.

The new route was used by the York Factory Express. The old canoe route involved going far north-northeast up the Athabasca to Fort Chipewyan and then southeast through Methye Portage to Lake Winnipeg. Though the fort never grew as large as some other Alberta forts, its role as a transportation hub and provision centre ensured its survival between the 1820s and 1880s. The fort burned to the ground after its abandonment by the HBC. No plans existed for its original layout, but, using clues from post administrators' log books and archaeological surveys, a replica was built on the site in 1980. It operates as a museum and friendship centre.

In 1898, when the Chalmers, or Klondike Trail was cut through the Swan Hills, northwest of Fort Assiniboine to Lesser Slave Lake, the location again became a stopping point, with gold seekers crossing the river with a self-service ferry on their overland trek to the Yukon.

The earliest homesteads in the area were filed in 1906 in the Holmes Crossing district (named for the ferryman William B. Holmes), across the Athabasca and downriver from Fort Assiniboine. Most came via Edmonton, by way of the Hudson's Bay Pack Trail, which had been widened by then to accommodate wagons and sleighs. By 1908 settlers crossed on the ferry and took up land north of the Athabasca River, including around the site of the old fort. The Fort Assiniboine post office was set up in 1910, operated, as was the practice, from a local homestead. Joseph Brewster was the first postmaster. A blacksmith's shop, and a store were soon built near the fort site. In 1914, the railway was built to Westlock, shortening the route on the trail significantly.

The first community hall was built in 1916. By 1919, the road was graded to Holmes Crossing. The next year, on the north side of the river, a road was graded from the ferry landing, to a bridge on the Freeman River west of Fort Assiniboine. In 1922, the post office was moved to the settlement. The quarter-section of land on which the trading post had been situated had been homesteaded by a Dr. E.J. State in 1913. When he died in 1923, his property was willed to the University of Alberta, who surveyed and sold the lots, expanding the hamlet.

In 1934 the provincial government set up a public nursing service in the hamlet, which operated until 1969. The surrounding schools were centralized to Fort Assiniboine in 1946, and in the same year a charter was issued for a Fort Assiniboine Branch of the Royal Canadian Legion. A United Church and a Roman Catholic Church were built in 1948 and 1949. The curling club was formed and a rink built in 1953. In 1956 a bridge was built over the Athabasca River, putting the ferry out of business.

Fort Assiniboine was a hamlet until incorporated as a village in 1958. E.M. (Gene) Redington was the first mayor. The Village of Fort Assiniboine dissolved and reverted to hamlet status on December 31, 1991. It is now administered by Woodlands County, which has offices in the hamlet and in Whitecourt.

Demographics 

Attractions 

Fort Assiniboine is home to a Hudson's Bay–style historical museum, known as the Fort Assiniboine Museum and Friendship Club Drop-In Centre, and the world's largest wagon wheel and pick axe. A boat launch east of the hamlet provides river-boaters access to the Athabasca River. There is also a private R.V. park and marina, which hosted the Athabasca River Voyageur Canoe Bridade in June 2017, celebrating Canada's 150th birthday. A farmer's market is held every Friday afternoon from May to September in the Recreation and  Agriculture Building, which also hosts agricultural and sports events throughout the year including the annual Hamlet Hoedown Rodeo & Fair, held each August.

Services 
The Fort Assiniboine School, which offers kindergarten through Grade 9, is located within the hamlet. Students in Grades 10-12 are bussed to Barrhead Composite High School. Both are administered by Pembina Hills Public Schools (PHPS). Fort Assiniboine is also served by a post office and the Fort Assiniboine Public Library. It has numerous businesses including a general store, a motel, a gas station, a liquor store and a shop that repairs and sells all-terrain and other vehicles.

Climate 
Fort Assiniboine had a subarctic climate (Köppen Dfc), characterized by pleasant summers and frigid, although extremely variable, winters.

See also 
Athabasca Landing Trail
List of communities in Alberta
List of former urban municipalities in Alberta
List of hamlets in Alberta

References

External links 
 Fort Assiniboine Museum

1823 establishments in the British Empire
Designated places in Alberta
Former villages in Alberta
Assiniboine
Forts or trading posts on the National Historic Sites of Canada register
Fur trade National Historic Sites of Canada
Hamlets in Alberta
Hudson's Bay Company forts
National Historic Sites in Alberta
Woodlands County
Populated places disestablished in 1991